Sergio Plaza Albiol (born 11 March 1987) is a Spanish footballer who plays as a right back.

He played one Segunda División match with Málaga B, and spent the rest of his career in the lower leagues.

Club career
Born in Málaga, Andalusia, Albiol graduated from local Málaga CF's youth system. He made his professional debut with the reserves on 21 May 2006, playing the entire second half of a 4–1 away loss against Real Madrid Castilla in the Segunda División.

After spending five seasons in the Tercera División (where he represented Polideportivo Ejido B, Murallas de Ceuta FC and Vélez CF), Albiol first arrived in the Segunda División B in 2011, signing with Sporting Villanueva Promesas. He continued to compete at the latter level in the following years, with Lucena CF (two stints), La Roda CF, FC Jumilla and Ontinyent CF.

On 28 March 2019, after the club's dissolution, Albiol left Ontinyent. He remained without a club until February 2020, when he joined Lorca FC on a short-term contract.

References

External links

1987 births
Living people
Spanish footballers
Footballers from Málaga
Association football defenders
Segunda División players
Segunda División B players
Tercera División players
Atlético Malagueño players
Polideportivo Ejido footballers
Lucena CF players
La Roda CF players
FC Jumilla players
Ontinyent CF players
Lorca FC players